The Our Lady of Poverty Cathedral, also called Pereira Cathedral, is the cathedral church of Catholic worship in the city of Pereira, capital of Risaralda department in the South American country of Colombia. The cathedral is dedicated to the Virgin Mary under the title of Our Lady of Poverty (Nuestra Señora de la Pobreza).

It is the main church of the Diocese of Pereira and was elevated to cathedral on December 18, 1952, by a bull of Pope Pius XII.

It is located on the western side of the Plaza de Bolivar, between Calles 20 and 21 south of Carrera 7, in the center of the city.

See also
Roman Catholicism in Colombia
Church of Our Lady (disambiguation)

References

Roman Catholic cathedrals in Colombia
Buildings and structures in Pereira, Colombia
Roman Catholic churches completed in 1890
19th-century Roman Catholic church buildings in Colombia